Abdoulay Diaby (born 21 May 1991) is a professional footballer who plays mainly as a left winger for Al Ittihad Kalba. Born in France, he represents Mali at international level.

Club career

Sedan
Born in Nanterre, France, Diaby began his career at Sedan, having been passed by INF Clairefontaine (France national Football team Centre). After progressing through the ranks of Sedan, Diaby made his professional debut on 4 May 2010 against Dijon, where he came on as a substitute for Lossémy Karaboué in the 73rd minute, in a 3–1 loss. He made another appearances for the side three days later on 7 May 2010, again coming on as a substitute, in a 0–0 draw against AC Arles-Avignon. He went on to make two appearances in the 2009–10 season.

In the 2010–11 season, Diaby made his first team appearance on 20 November 2010, where he started the match, in a 2–0 win over FC Steinseltz in the seventh round of Coupe de France. On 13 January 2011, he signed his first professional contract with the club, keeping him until 2014. He scored his first goal for the club and set up one of the goals, in a 5–3 loss against FC Istres on 11 March 2011. Seven days later, on 18 March 2011, he scored in a follow–up match, in a 1–1 draw against Le Havre. By the end of the 2010–11 season, he had made eleven appearances scoring two times in all competitions.

In the 2011–12 season, Diaby scored his first goal of the season, in a 2–1 loss against Clermont Foot on 12 August 2011. A month later, on 16 September 2011, he scored again, in a 3–0 win over Le Havre. He then scored three goals throughout October, scoring against Angers SCO (twice) and Lille. He ended a two-month goal drought on 9 March 2012 when he scored in a 1–1 draw against US Boulogne. He was in another goal drought when on 18 May 2012, he scored in a 2–1 win over Nantes. Despite suffering injuries during the 2011–12 season, Diaby went on to make 31 appearances and scoring nine times in all competitions.

In the 2012–13 season, Diaby scored his first goal of the season, in a 3–2 loss against Nîmes Olympique on 17 August 2012. During a 2–0 win over Clermont Foot on 24 August 2012, he was sent–off for a straight red card in the 80th minute. After serving a match suspension, Diaby returned to the starting line-up and scored in a 3–1 loss against Stade Lavallois on 14 September 2012. After being dropped from the first team for "disciplinary reasons" in early–November, he scored on his return on 9 November 2012, in a 1–1 draw against Gazélec Ajaccio. During a match against Auxerre on 26 February 2013, he scored his seventh goal of the season, in a 1–0 win. Despite suffering from injury and suspension towards the end of the 2012–13 season, Diaby went on to make 28 appearances and scoring seven times in all competitions. Following the club's relegation to Championnat de France Amateur, he was released.

Lille
It was announced on 30 July 2013 that Diaby joined Lille on a three–year contract with the club.

After his two years spell at Royal Mouscron-Péruwelz came to an end in the 2014–15 season, Diaby signed a two–year contract with Lille, keeping him until 2019. He made his Lille debut on 28 February 2015, where he came on as a late substitute for Divock Origi, in a 2–1 win against Lyon. He went on to make two more appearances later in the season, both coming as a substitute.

Royal Mouscron-Péruwelz (loan)
Immediately after joining Lille, Diaby moved to Belgium, where he joined Mouscron-Péruwelz.

Diaby made his Royal Mouscron-Péruwelz debut, where he came on as a substitute for Antonio Jakoliš in the 74th minute, in a 2–1 win over RWS Bruxelles on 10 August 2013. On 4 September 2013, he scored his first goal for the club, in a 3–2 win over Eendracht Aalst. After not featuring for the first team in two months, he made his return on 29 November 2013, starting in a 2–0 win over K.S.V. Roeselare. After missing out two matches in mid–January, he scored on his return, in a 2–1 win over Eendracht Aalst on 25 January 2014. Later in the 2013–14 season, Diaby helped the side get promoted to Jupiler Pro League next season. He finished the season, making 20 appearances and scoring four times in all competitions.

It was announced on 12 July 2014 that Diaby re-joined Mouscron-Péruwelz for the second time on loan. In his second season, with Royal Mouscron-Péruwelz in the Jupiler Pro League, he started well scoring against Waasland-Beveren, Standard Liège (twice), Zulte Waregem and Cercle Brugge (twice). He later added his tenth and eleventh goal against Lierse and Waasland-Beveren. In January 2015, Diaby returned to his parent club. By the time of his departure, he made 22 appearances and scoring 12 times (which he was the top scorer at the time and still was at the end of the 2014–15 season) in all competitions.

Club Brugge
After announcing his intention to move to Belgium, it was announced on 22 May 2015 that Diaby joined Jupiler Pro League side Club Brugge, signing a four-year contract. The transfer move reported to cost €2 million. Upon joining the club, he said his target in his first season at Club Brugge was to score at least 20 goals.

Diaby made his Club Brugge debut on 16 July 2015, where he started the whole game, in a 1–0 against Gent in the Belgian Super Cup. Two weeks later, on 1 August 2015, he made his league debut for Club Brugge, in a 2–1 loss against Sint-Truidense. In a follow up match against KV Mechelen on 1 August 2015, Diaby scored his first goal for the club, in a 3–0 win. On 30 August 2015, he scored four times, in a 7–1 win over Standard Liège. After two months goal drought, he scored twice on 28 October 2015 in a 2–0 win over OH Leuven, followed up by scoring in a 2–0 win over Westerlo. During December, he added four goals, which were against Charleroi, Westerlo (twice) and K.V. Kortrijk. Diaby then scored in both legs against Gent in the semi–finals of the Belgium Cup, which a 1–0 win against them saw them reach the final via away goal. Despite suffering some injuries setback, he eventually played in the final against Standard Liege, but was sent–off for a professional foul on Giannis Maniatis, as Club Brugge eventually lose 2–1. After serving a one-match suspension, he returned to the starting lineup on 9 April 2016 against Gent, which saw Club Brugge win 2–0. He then played a vital role towards the end of the 2015–16 season, including scoring twice, in a 4–0 win over Anderlecht to win the league title for the first time in eleven years. Despite facing competitions from Jelle Vossen, Leandro Pereira, Wesley Moraes, Bernie Ibini-Isei and José Izquierdo throughout the 2015–16 season, Diaby went on to make 47 appearances and scoring 20 times (thirteen of which was the joint top scorer with Vossen) in all competitions.

In the 2016–17 season, Diaby retained his first team place for the side, playing in the striker position. He struggled to score goals as he did last season. soon suffered his own injuries concern as a result. On 25 January 2017, he returned from injury, coming on as a late substitute, in a 2–1 win over Waasland-Beveren. Once again, he suffered an Osteitis pubis that saw him sidelined for the rest of the season. Until the end of the 2016–17 season, Diaby went on to make 20 appearances in all competitions.

At the start of the 2017–18 season, Diaby returned from injury in the pre–season and didn't make his first appearance of the season on 2 August 2017, in the second leg of the UEFA Champions League Qualifying Round against İstanbul Başakşehir, which saw them lose 3–0, and was eliminated from the tournament. Four days later, on 6 August 2017, he scored his first goal of the season, in a 3–1 win over Eupen. Two weeks later, on 20 August 2017, he scored again, in a 2–1 win over K.V. Kortrijk. Throughout December, Diaby produced a goal scoring form against Lokeren, Anderlecht (twice), KV Mechelen and Royal Mouscron-Péruwelz (twice). By December, he scored nine goals for the side this season. In the league's Championship play-offs, Diaby scored four goals for the side, scoring against RSC Charleroi, Standard Liège (twice) and Anderlecht. He suffered ankle injury that saw him sidelined for the rest of the season. Shortly after, the club went on to win the league for the second time for the last two years, as he was among three players to play a role this season to win the Championship. Despite being absent from the first team, due to injuries this season, Diaby continued to remain in the first team despite facing competitions from Vossen and Wesley. Diaby finished the 2017–18 season with 41 appearances and 16 goals in all competitions.

Sporting CP
It was announced on 21 August 2018 that Diaby joined Portuguese club Sporting CP, signing a five–year contract on an undisclosed fee, though it was reported to cost €4 million. The club also inserted a US$70 million release clause on Diaby. Upon joining the club, Diaby said of the move: "I am very happy to be here. Sporting CP is a great club and as soon as I heard about the possibility of coming here I did not hesitate, I know that Portuguese football has great clubs, that are always participating in European competitions." He made his league debut for the club on 24 September 2018, coming on as an 86th-minute substitute for Nemanja Gudelj in a 1–0 away defeat to Braga.

On 5 October 2020, after spending the entire 2019–20 campaign on loan at Beşiktaş JK, Diaby was loaned to La Liga side Getafe CF, for one year.

On 17 January 2021, Diaby was recalled by Sporting CP from Getafe after three appearances and subsequently loaned to Belgian club RSC Anderlecht until the end of the season.

Loan to Anderlecht 
On 18 January 2021, Diaby joined Belgian First Division A club Anderlecht on loan until the end of the season. The loan included an option to buy.

International career
In October 2014, Diaby was called up by Mali for the first time; then scoring on his debut, in a 2–0 win over Ethiopia on 11 October 2014. Mali eventually qualified for the 2015 Africa Cup of Nations after beating Algeria 2–0 on 19 November 2014.

In late–December 2014, Diaby was listed in the national team 35 men provisional squad. After appearing twice as an unused substitute in the first two matches in the tournament, he made his first appearance of the tournament, where he started the match before being substituted, in a 1–1 draw against Guinea on 28 January 2015.

Almost a year later, on 6 September 2015, Diaby scored his first goal in eleven months, in a 1–1 draw against Benin. In the Africa Cup of Nations qualification, Diaby then scored two goals in two matches between 4 June 2016 and 4 September 2016 against South Sudan and Benin. He then ended his two-year goal drought when he scored the first-half penalty, in a 1–1 draw against Japan on 23 March 2018.

Career statistics

Club

International

Scores and results list Mali's goal tally first, score column indicates score after each Diaby goal.

Honours
Club Brugge
Belgian Pro League: 2015–16, 2017–18
Belgian Super Cup: 2016

Sporting CP
Taça de Portugal: 2018–19
Taça da Liga: 2018–19

Al Jazira
 UAE Super Cup: 2021

References

External links

1991 births
Living people
People from Nanterre
Footballers from Hauts-de-Seine
French footballers
Citizens of Mali through descent
Malian footballers
Mali international footballers
Association football forwards
CS Sedan Ardennes players
Lille OSC players
Royal Excel Mouscron players
Club Brugge KV players
Sporting CP footballers
Beşiktaş J.K. footballers
Getafe CF footballers
Al Jazira Club players
Ligue 1 players
Ligue 2 players
Belgian Pro League players
Challenger Pro League players
Primeira Liga players
UAE Pro League players
2015 Africa Cup of Nations players
2019 Africa Cup of Nations players
French expatriate footballers
Malian expatriate footballers
Expatriate footballers in Belgium
Expatriate footballers in Portugal
Expatriate footballers in Turkey
Expatriate footballers in Spain
Expatriate footballers in the United Arab Emirates
French expatriate sportspeople in Belgium
French expatriate sportspeople in Portugal
French expatriate sportspeople in Turkey
Malian expatriate sportspeople in Belgium
Malian expatriate sportspeople in Portugal
Malian expatriate sportspeople in Turkey
Malian expatriate sportspeople in Spain
Malian expatriate sportspeople in the United Arab Emirates
French sportspeople of Malian descent